The 2018 Hartlepool Borough Council election took place on 3 May 2018 to elect members of Hartlepool Borough Council in England. This was on the same day as other local elections.

Ward Results

Burn Valley

De Bruce

Fens & Rossmere

References

Hartlepool
Hartlepool Borough Council elections